Senator Ashburn may refer to:

Roy Ashburn (born 1954), California State Senate
Thomas Q. Ashburn (1820–1890), Ohio State Senate

See also
Senator Washburn (disambiguation)